Tristia, Op. 18 is a musical work consisting of three short pieces for chorus and orchestra by the French composer Hector Berlioz. Apart from its title, it has nothing to do with the collection of Latin poems  by Ovid (the word tristia in Latin means 'sad things').  The individual works were composed at different times and published together in 1852. Berlioz associated them in his mind with Shakespeare's Hamlet, one of his favourite plays. They were never performed during the composer's lifetime.

Details of the work 
The three movements are:

References 
David Cairns: Berlioz: Servitude and Greatness (the second volume of his biography of the composer) (Viking, 1999)
Hugh Macdonald: Berlioz ("The Master Musicians", J.M.Dent, 1982)
Berlioz: Memoirs (Dover, 1960)

External links 
 Information on the Funeral March
Legouvé's French text for La mort d'Ophélie.

Compositions by Hector Berlioz
Choral compositions
1852 compositions